San Pedro Ixcatlán is a town and municipality in Oaxaca in south-western Mexico. The municipality covers an area of  km². 
It is part of the Tuxtepec District of the Papaloapan Region.

References

External links
Ixcatlán, Santa María, Mexico is a map from 1579

Municipalities of Oaxaca